Climate Change and Global Energy Security: Technology and Policy Options is a 2011 book by Marilyn A. Brown and Benjamin K. Sovacool, in which the authors offer detailed assessments of commercially available technologies for strengthening global energy security and climate change mitigation. They also evaluate the barriers to the deployment of these technologies and critically review public policy options for their commercialization. Arguing that society has all the technologies necessary for the task, they discuss an array of options available today, including high-efficiency transportation, renewable energy, carbon sequestration, and demand side management.

See also

List of books about renewable energy
List of books about energy issues
Renewable energy commercialization
Renewable energy policy
Sustainable business
Life-cycle greenhouse-gas emissions of energy sources

References

External links
Climate Change and Global Energy Security: Technology and Policy Options'', MIT Press.

2011 non-fiction books
2011 in the environment
Climate change books
Books about energy issues
MIT Press books